The 2022 Women's European Volleyball League was the 13th edition of the annual Women's European Volleyball League, which featured women's national volleyball teams from 14 European countries. Ukraine was originally scheduled to host the Final Four tournament but due to 2022 Russian invasion of Ukraine there will be no host nation.

The tournament had two divisions: the Golden League, which featured nine teams, and the Silver League, which featured five teams.

Pools composition
Teams were seeded following the Serpentine system according to their European Ranking for national teams as of September 2021. Rankings are shown in brackets.

Golden league

Silver league

Pool standing procedure
 Total number of victories (matches won, matches lost)
 In the event of a tie, the following first tiebreaker will apply: The teams will be ranked by the most point gained per match as follows:
Match won 3–0 or 3–1: 3 points for the winner, 0 points for the loser
Match won 3–2: 2 points for the winner, 1 point for the loser
Match forfeited: 3 points for the winner, 0 points (0–25, 0–25, 0–25) for the loser
 If teams are still tied after examining the number of victories and points gained, then the FIVB will examine the results in order to break the tie in the following order:
Set quotient: if two or more teams are tied on the number of points gained, they will be ranked by the quotient resulting from the division of the number of all set won by the number of all sets lost.
Points quotient: if the tie persists based on the set quotient, the teams will be ranked by the quotient resulting from the division of all points scored by the total of points lost during all sets.
If the tie persists based on the point quotient, the tie will be broken based on the team that won the match of the Round Robin Phase between the tied teams. When the tie in point quotient is between three or more teams, these teams ranked taking into consideration only the matches involving the teams in question.

League round

Golden league
All times are local.

Pool A

|}

|}

Pool B

|}

|}

Pool C

|}

|}

Ranking of the second placed teams

|}

Silver league
All times are local.

|}

|}

Final round

Golden league

Semifinals

|}

Final

|}

Silver league

Final

|}

Final standing

Awards 

Most Valuable Player
 Lucille Gicquel

See also
2022 Men's European Volleyball League

References

Europe
European Volleyball League
European Volleyball League
European Volleyball League